Ricky Williams (born 29 May 1989 from Portsmouth, Hampshire) is a professional English darts player who plays in Professional Darts Corporation events.

He won the Mill Rythe Darts Festival in 2009 and the Malta Open in 2013. He also won a PDC Tour Card in 2016.

References

External links
Profile and stats on Darts Database

1989 births
Living people
English darts players
Sportspeople from Portsmouth
Professional Darts Corporation former tour card holders